The Orlen Nations Grand Prix is a multi-day road cycling race held annually in Poland. It is part of the UCI Under 23 Nations' Cup, and is therefore reserved to under-23 cyclists.

Winners

References

External links

Cycle races in Poland
UCI Europe Tour races
Recurring sporting events established in 2019